The Steyr Model 1912 were Gewehr 98 pattern bolt-action battle rifles produced by Steyr before World War I. They were designed for export market. During the war, they were also used by the Austro-Hungarian Army.

Design 
The rifle was a close copy of the Gewehr 98. It had a pistol grip stock. The rifle featured an "H"-type upper band. The upper hand guard was shorter.

The carbine and short rifle versions had a turned-town bolt handle and were shorter, with sights graduated until .

The version pressed into Austrian service in 1914 was only modified by using a bigger sling swivel.

Service 

It was ordered by Mexico, Colombia, Chile, China, Mexican Model 1912 were used from 1913 by the Federal Army that fought during the Mexican Revolution.
In 1914, 66,979 Mexican-contract rifles, 5,000 Colombian rifles and 43,100 Chilean rifles and carbines were pressed into Austria-Hungarian service as Repetiergewehr M.14.

The Czech vz. 98/22 was a close-copy of the Steyr M1912 and the vz. 12/33 carbine derives from the M1912 carbine. Some of the non-delivered Mexican Model 1912 rifles were modernized as 7.92×57mm Mauser Model 24B in Yugoslavia. In 1929, 5,000 M1912 short rifles, with a  barrel, were manufactured  by Československá zbrojovka Brno from Steyr spare parts. In 1961, Chilean M1912 were upgraded with a 7.62×51mm NATO  barrel, as Modelo 12/61.

Users 

 : Repetiergewehr M.14 
 : Modelo 1912 and Model 12/61
 : ?
 : Modelo 1912
 : Modelo 1912
 : M24B

References

See also 
 Mexican Mauser Model 1902

Steyr Mannlicher
World War I Austro-Hungarian infantry weapons
Weapons and ammunition introduced in 1912
Mauser rifles